Joana Campos Ceddia (born June 21, 2001) is a Brazilian-Canadian former YouTuber, vlogger and former competitive swimmer and runner. A nominee of a Streamy Award and a Shorty Award, Ceddia is known for her quirky and ironic sense of humor, and is famed for her work on YouTube targeted towards teenage audiences.

On October 30, 2021, Ceddia's YouTube channel and Instagram account were deleted. The reasons behind the deletions remain unknown.

Early life 
Joana Campos Ceddia was born on June 21, 2001, in Rio de Janeiro, Brazil, to Denilce Campos, a former professional gymnast, who represented Brazil at the 1980 and 1982 South American Artistic Gymnastics Championships, winning gold in team all-around both times, and Rolando Ceddia, who is currently an associate professor at the School of Kinesiology & Health Science at York University. Ceddia currently resides in Toronto, where she studies physics and astronomy.

Career 
Ceddia participated in competitive school swimming and is an OFSAA gold medalist. After suffering an injury that prevented her from pursuing a career in competitive running, she created her YouTube channel in 2018, initially uploading videos of her creating artwork. She then received recognition for her video where she attempts to cut her own hair with craft scissors, which gained over 13 million views prior to its deletion.

Ceddia then became an internet sensation, gaining nearly two million subscribers in the space of a few months. She had been faced with controversy in 2018, being accused on platforms such as Reddit of buying her subscribers due to the abnormal rate of growth she had been receiving on her channel, although it has been disproven statistically.

While she was active, her most notable content included recreating popular artwork, making vlogs and jokingly "transforming" herself into popular characters and public figures by creating costumes. For her work, she was a finalist for the "Best YouTube Comedian" category at the Shorty Awards in 2018, and was nominated for the "Breakout Creator" category at the 2019 Streamy Awards. As of July 2021, her YouTube channel had accumulated 3.28 million subscribers and 316,388,216 views from her videos collectively.

Following the deletions of her YouTube channel and Instagram account on October 30, 2021, Ceddia no longer has a presence on any social media platform.

Awards and nominations

References 

2001 births
Living people
People from Rio de Janeiro (city)
Brazilian expatriates in Canada
Brazilian YouTubers
Canadian YouTubers
Video bloggers
Women video bloggers
Brazilian bloggers
Canadian bloggers
Brazilian women bloggers
Canadian women bloggers
YouTube channels launched in 2018
Canadian people of Brazilian descent